The 2018–19 George Mason Patriots women's basketball team represents George Mason University during the 2018–19 NCAA Division I women's basketball season. The Patriots, led by sixth year head coach Nyla Milleson, play their home games at EagleBank Arena and were members of the Atlantic 10 Conference. They finished the season 16–14, 8–8 in A-10 play to finish in seventh place. They lost in the first round of the A-10 women's tournament to George Washington.

Media

George Mason Patriots Sports Network
Patriots games will be broadcast on WGMU Radio and streamed online through Patriot Vision . Most home games will also be featured on the A-10 Digital Network. Select games will be televised.

Roster

Schedule

|-
!colspan=9 style=| Non-conference regular season

|-
!colspan=9 style=| Atlantic 10 regular season

|-
!colspan=9 style=| Atlantic 10 Women's Tournament

Rankings
2018–19 NCAA Division I women's basketball rankings

See also
 2018–19 George Mason Patriots men's basketball team

References

George Mason Patriots women's basketball seasons
George Mason
George Mason Patriots women's basketball
George Mason Patriots women's basketball